Frank Boateng (born 11 May 1974) is a Ghanaian hurdler. He competed in the men's 110 metres hurdles at the 1996 Summer Olympics.

References

1974 births
Living people
Athletes (track and field) at the 1996 Summer Olympics
Ghanaian male hurdlers
Olympic athletes of Ghana
Place of birth missing (living people)